Framing the Early Middle Ages: Europe and the Mediterranean 400–800 is a 2005 history book by English historian Christopher Wickham at the University of Oxford. It is a broad history of the period between the fall of the Western Roman Empire and the transition to the Middle Ages, often called Late Antiquity.

The book won the 2005 Wolfson History Prize, the 2006 Deutscher Memorial Prize, and the 2006 James Henry Breasted Prize from the American Historical Association.

According to Chris Wickham's website, the book will "lead into a general study of the early middle ages for Penguin books." This book, titled The Inheritance of Rome: A History of Europe from 400 to 1000, was published on March 24, 2009.

Notes

Editions
Hardcover, Oxford University Press, 
Paperback,

External links
Reviews

 
 
 
 
 
 
 

2005 non-fiction books
21st-century history books
History books about Europe
Medieval studies literature
Oxford University Press books